Peanuts Motion Comics is a series of animated cartoon shorts based on 1964 strips of Charles Schulz' comic strip, Peanuts. The series premiered on iTunes on November 3, 2008 with the support of the Schulz estate. The first season consists of 20 cartoon shorts, paired into 10 episodes. The episodes employ signature themes and plotlines from the classic strips. The first season was released to DVD on March 9, 2010. Animation production was done by Studio B Productions.

Voice actors
Alex Ferris as Charlie Brown
Michelle Creber as Lucy van Pelt
Claire Corlett as Sally Brown
Quinn Lord as Linus van Pelt
Jake D. Smith as Schroeder/Shermy
Taya Calicetto as Violet Gray
Leigh Bourke as Patty
Alison Cohen as Frieda
Bill Melendez as Snoopy (non-speaking)/additional voices

List of episodes

External links

References

Works based on Peanuts (comic strip)
American animated short films
2008 short films
2008 films
2000s American films